John Sidney, 6th Earl of Leicester KB (14 February 168027 September 1737) was an English soldier, peer, landowner, and courtier, and from 1705 to 1737 was Earl of Leicester, with a seat in the House of Lords.

Life
Leicester was born at his family seat of Penshurst Place in Kent. He was one of the five sons of Robert Sidney, 4th Earl of Leicester (1649–1702) by Lady Elizabeth Egerton (1653–1709), the daughter of John Egerton, 2nd Earl of Bridgewater.

Before inheriting the title and estates, Leicester was Lieutenant Colonel of the 1st Regiment of Foot Guards, 1702 to 1705, then briefly a member of the English House of Commons as one of the two members for Brackley, sitting as a Whig, and later in 1705 succeeded his brother, Philip Sidney, as Earl of Leicester.

He was a Lord of the Bedchamber, 1717 to 1727, Lord Warden of the Cinque Ports, 1717 to 1728, Captain of the Yeomen of the Guard, 1725 to 1731, Lord Lieutenant of Kent from 1724 until his death, a Privy Councillor and Constable of the Tower of London from 1731.

Leicester died at Penshurst Place and is buried at Penshurst. His younger brother Jocelyn Sidney succeeded as 7th Earl of Leicester.

Notes

1680 births
1737 deaths
6th Earl of Leicester
Knights Companion of the Order of the Bath
Lord-Lieutenants of Kent
Lord-Lieutenants of the Tower Hamlets
Lords Warden of the Cinque Ports
Sidney, John
Members of the Privy Council of Great Britain
People from Penshurst
Grenadier Guards officers
John